The 3rd Legislative Assembly of Saskatchewan was elected in the Saskatchewan general election held in July 1912. The assembly sat from November 14, 1912, to June 2, 1917. The Liberal Party led by Walter Scott formed the government. Scott resigned as premier on October 16, 1916, and was succeeded by William Melville Martin. The Conservative Party of Saskatchewan led by Wellington Willoughby formed the official opposition.

John Albert Sheppard served as speaker for the assembly until October 1916. Robert Menzies Mitchell became speaker in 1917.

Members of the Assembly 
The following members were elected to the assembly in 1912:

Notes:

Party Standings 

Notes:

By-elections 
By-elections were held to replace members for various reasons:

Notes:

References 

Terms of the Saskatchewan Legislature